Hassan Khalid Hassan Al-Haydos (born 11 December 1990) is a Qatari professional footballer who plays as a forward for Qatar Stars League club Al Sadd and the Qatar national team.

Club career

Al-Haydos started playing football for Al Sadd at the age of eight, advancing through the ranks until he reached the first team at age seventeen. He had support and guidance early on from Jafal Rashed Al-Kuwari.

He was one of the players to take a penalty kick in the penalty-shootout against Jeonbuk in the 2011 AFC Champions League, scoring after the ball deflected off the top post. The victory ensured Al Sadd would earn a place in the FIFA Club World Cup as the representative for Asia. In the third-place match between Al Sadd and Kashiwa Reysol, he was again selected to take one of the penalty kicks after the match had ended 0–0. The penalty shoot-out was won by Al Sadd 5–3.

He was voted as the 'Best Qatari Player' in 2014 in a poll conducted by Doha Stadium, receiving 58 out of 104 votes from a panel of analysts, coaches and administrators.

International career
Al-Haydos made his debut for the Qatar Olympic team in 2007, coming off the bench to score a late goal against Japan in the 2008 Summer Olympic Qualifiers in order to help his team salvage a 2–1 win. He featured in two other matches in the competition, one against Saudi Arabia, and one against Vietnam, where he scored a goal; both as second-half substitutes. He also played a large part in the 2012 Summer Olympic Qualifiers as the captain, scoring a goal against India in the preliminary stage. He played all the matches in the group stage, scoring a goal against Oman, and scoring against Saudi Arabia after being set up by Saleh Badr to give Qatar a 2–1 win and a glance of hope for qualifying for the Olympics. He won the Man of the Match award.

Al-Haydos made his debut for the senior Qatar national football team in a 2010 FIFA World Cup qualifying match against Bahrain on 10 September 2008. He has since made 146 appearances and scored 32 goals for the national side, making him the most capped Qatari footballer ever and the joint-fourth highest goalscorer alongside Mohammed Salem Al-Enazi.

Career statistics

Club
Statistics accurate as of 18 March 2023

1Includes Emir of Qatar Cup and Qatar Crown Prince Cup.
2Includes Sheikh Jassim Cup and Qatari Stars Cup.
3Includes AFC Champions League and FIFA Club World Cup.

International

International goals
Scores and results list Qatar's goal tally first.

Honours

Al Sadd
Qatar Stars League (5): 2006–07, 2012–13, 2018–19, 2020–21, 2021–22
Emir of Qatar Cup (6): 2007, 2014, 2015, 2017, 2020, 2021
Qatar Cup (5): 2007, 2008, 2017, 2020, 2021
Sheikh Jassem Cup (4): 2007, 2014, 2017, 2019
Qatari Stars Cup (2): 2010, 2019-20
AFC Champions League (1): 2011
FIFA Club World Cup third place: 2011

Qatar
AFC Asian Cup (1): 2019
Gulf Cup of Nations (1): 2014

Individual
Qatar Football Association Most Promising Player (1): 2008
 Estad Doha Qatar Player of the Year (1): 2014
Qatar Football Association Player of the Year (1): 2015
 AFC Asian Cup Team of the Tournament: 2019

See also 
 List of men's footballers with 100 or more international caps
 List of one-club men in association football

References

External links

 Hassan Al Haydos Fan Website 
 
Official Al Sadd Sports Club website
Profile at QSL.com.qa

1990 births
Living people
Qatari footballers
Qatar international footballers
Al Sadd SC players
People from Doha
Association football wingers
Association football forwards
Footballers at the 2010 Asian Games
FIFA Century Club
AFC Asian Cup-winning players
Asian Games competitors for Qatar
Qatar Stars League players
2011 AFC Asian Cup players
2015 AFC Asian Cup players
2019 AFC Asian Cup players
2019 Copa América players
2021 CONCACAF Gold Cup players
Qatar youth international footballers
Qatar under-20 international footballers
2022 FIFA World Cup players